is a retired Japanese weightlifter. He won a bronze medal in the flyweight category at the 1984 Summer Olympics, as well as two bronze medals at world championships in 1981 and 1984; weightlifting at the latter championships was combined with the 1984 Olympics. He finished eighth at the 1988 Games.

He graduated from the Niihama Technical High School and later worked at the Izumi Chemical company.

References

1958 births
Japanese male weightlifters
Living people
Olympic weightlifters of Japan
Weightlifters at the 1984 Summer Olympics
Weightlifters at the 1988 Summer Olympics
Olympic bronze medalists for Japan
Olympic medalists in weightlifting
Asian Games medalists in weightlifting
Weightlifters at the 1982 Asian Games
Weightlifters at the 1986 Asian Games
Medalists at the 1984 Summer Olympics
Asian Games gold medalists for Japan
Asian Games silver medalists for Japan
Medalists at the 1982 Asian Games
Medalists at the 1986 Asian Games
People from Niihama, Ehime
Sportspeople from Ehime Prefecture
20th-century Japanese people
21st-century Japanese people